Gordon's syndrome may refer to the following medical conditions:
a specific subtype of a clinical disorder called Pseudohypoaldosteronism, that is type II, sometimes abbreviated as PHAII
a form of arthrogryposis.